Ogburn is a surname. Notable people with the surname include:

Charlton Ogburn (1911-1998), American journalist and author
Charlton Greenwood Ogburn (1882-1962), American lawyer 
John Ogburn (1925-2010), Australian painter
Michael Ogburn (born 1948), British footballer
William Fielding Ogburn (1886-1959), American sociologist
Colton Ogburn (1997-Present), American writer, pundit, and filmmaker.